The 2019 Production Alliance Group 300 was a NASCAR Xfinity Series race held on March 16, 2019, at Auto Club Speedway in Fontana, California. Contested over 150 laps on the  D-shaped oval, it was the fifth race of the 2019 NASCAR Xfinity Series season.

Entry list

Practice

First practice

Final practice

Qualifying

Qualifying results

Race

Stage Results

Stage One
Laps: 35

Stage Two
Laps: 35

Final Stage Results

Stage Three
Laps: 80

References

2019 in sports in California
Production Alliance Group 300
NASCAR races at Auto Club Speedway
2019 NASCAR Xfinity Series